Nordschwarzwaldturm (Tower of Northern Black Forest) is the name of a  free standing steel framework tower near Schoemberg-Langenbrand in the Black Forest. The Nordschwarzwaldturm was built in 1974 and is used for directional radio services, FM- and TV-transmissions. The tower is not open for the public.

Transmitted programmes

See also
 List of towers

Notes

External links
 
 http://www.skyscraperpage.com/diagrams/?b46052

Towers completed in 1974
Communication towers in Germany
1974 establishments in West Germany